MV APL Austria is a Liberian-registered container ship. The ship is owned by Marugame Kisen Kaisha and operated by American President Lines (APL).

Description
She is a type Imabari 6350 container ship constructed in 2007 at the Koyo Dockyard Co. Ltd Shipyard in Mihara, Japan.

2017 fire
The ship was on its voyage from European ports to Asian ports with 8,235 containers when a fire broke out in the ship's middle cargo hold. Four non-essential crew members evacuated from the ship, one evacuee suffered a leg injury and was treated on shore. She was subsequently repaired and returned to service.

References

Container ships
2007 ships